It's Been a Long Time may refer to:

 It's Been a Long Time (Ju-Taun album), 2003
 It's Been a Long Time, an album by New Birth, 1974
 "It's Been a Long Time", a song by Dead or Alive from the album Youthquake
"It's Been a Long, Long Time", a 1945 song written by Jule Styne and Sammy Cahn